William Parodi studied law in Panama's National University and has a Master's degree on financial crimes from Spain.

Parodi is currently the prosecuting officer  for circuit 14th, Panama city, Panama. His office is responsible for financial crimes and it is currently responsible for the David Murcia / D.M.G. Grupo Holding S.A. case.

References

21st-century Panamanian lawyers
Living people
1973 births